FK Šilas is a Lithuanian football club from the city of Kazlų Rūda. The team competes in the I Lyga, in second tier of Lithuanian football since 2021.

In 2022, after a merger, the club was renamed to Marijampolė City, and moved to Marijampolė.

History
Šilas was founded in 1940 as FK Ąžuolas. The club has been renamed several times in the following years. 

In 2016 Šilas won I Lyga and hoped for promotion to A Lyga, but after a match fixing scandal were relegated to II Lyga. The club was officially declared entering administration, and therefore were not allowed to play in A Lyga or I Lyga. As FK Šilas lost place in A Lyga, FK Kauno Žalgiris got saved from the relegation to I Lyga.

The club finished in 10th position in II lyga in 2017, but recovered the next year and became one of the leaders of the II Lyga. In 2020 Šilas won II Lyga Southern zone championship and was promoted to 2021 I Lyga. Šilas successfully obtained 2021 I Lyga licence and reached the third place same season. 

In 2022, after disputes over funding with Kazlų Rūda city council, FK Šilas struck a deal with Marijampolė City, and moved to Marijampolė.

Honours

Domestic
  Pirma lyga (D2)
  Winners: 2016

  II Lyga, Southernern Zone (D3)
  Winners: 2020
  Runners-up: 2018, 2019

Recent seasons

Kit evoliution 
 In 2021 team wearing Joma`s kits. 
 First (home) kits is green jersey, shorts and socks.
 Second (away) kits is black jersey, shorts and socks.

Colours 
 ???? – 2021

Kit changes

Stadium
Club play their home matches in Kazlų Rūda Stadium (lt. Kazlų Rūdos miesto stadionas). The current capacity of the stadium is 1,000 seats.

Current squad

Staff

Managers

 Saulius Vikertas (unknown – 11 December 2015)
 Gediminas Jarmalavičius (11 December 2015 – March 10, 2017)
 Saulius Vikertas (10 March 2017 – unknown)
 Gediminas Jarmalavičius (2021–present)

Notable players
FK Šilas players who have either appeared for their respective national team at any time or received an individual award while at the club. Players whose name is listed in bold represented their countries while playing for Šilas.

Lithuania
 Ričardas Beniušis

References

External links
fksilas.lt
lietuvosfutbolas.lt
futbolinis.lt
Soccerway

 
Football clubs in Lithuania
Sport in Kazlų Rūda
1940 establishments in Lithuania
Association football clubs established in 1940